Tonight Alright is the sixth studio album by Australian alternative rock band Spiderbait, recorded in Weed, California by producer, Sylvia Massy, which was released in March 2004. It peaked at No. 14 on the ARIA Albums Chart and was certified gold. "Black Betty", a cover of a song by British-American rock band Ram Jam, appears on the soundtracks for the 2004 film Without a Paddle and the racing video game Need for Speed: Underground 2.

Track listing

Charts

Weekly charts

Year-end charts

Certifications

Release history

References 

2004 albums
Albums produced by Sylvia Massy
Spiderbait albums